Diego Castro Giménez (born 2 July 1982) is a Spanish professional footballer who plays as a left winger.

He amassed La Liga totals of 226 games and 43 goals over eight seasons, mainly representing Getafe (four years) and Sporting de Gijón (three). In 2015 he transferred to Perth Glory, going on to spend six years with them in the A-League.

Club career

Málaga and Sporting
Castro was born in Pontevedra, Galicia. After starting out professionally with local Pontevedra CF (third division) he moved to Málaga CF, but spent almost three seasons mainly registered with the Andalusians' reserves; in December 2005, he appeared in two consecutive home losses for the main squad, against CA Osasuna (2–1) and Real Madrid (2–0).

After both Málaga teams dropped down a level in 2006, Castro moved to Sporting de Gijón in division two, being an essential first-team element from the start (20 league goals in his first three seasons combined – with the Asturians achieving La Liga promotion in his third – six of them in 2008–09, as the club narrowly avoided relegation).

In the following campaign, Castro was arguably Sporting's most important player as he topped their scoring charts at ten, four of those coming through penalties. Sporting again managed to stay in the top division.

Castro again led Sporting de Gijón in goals scored in 2010–11, netting one goal less. On 13 March 2011, after Nacho Novo won a penalty kick in the last-minute of an away fixture against Villarreal CF, he converted it in Panenka-style for a final 1–1 draw – the visiting team was then reduced to only nine players.

Getafe
Shortly after the season ended, Castro confirmed his departure from Sporting as a free agent, signing shortly after for Getafe CF. On 3 June 2015, after four years as first choice, he left the latter after his contract expired.

Perth Glory
On 6 August 2015, aged 33, Castro moved abroad for the first time in his career, joining A-League club Perth Glory FC as their foreign marquee player. He scored his first goal for his new team on 25 October, contributing to a 3–1 home win against Adelaide United FC. He enjoyed a successful debut season, earning selection for the PFA Team of the Year and winning the Alex Tobin award as well as the Johnny Warren Medal.

On 7 June 2016, Castro extended his stay with Perth Glory, agreeing to a deal believed to be worth approximately $500,000. Before the start of the 2018–19 season, he was named team captain.

Castro agreed to a two-year extension on 23 April 2019. On 14 October 2021, it was confirmed that the 39-year-old would be leaving due to restrictions on visa players and the incoming signing of Daniel Sturridge. A statement from CEO Tony Pignata on the club's official website spoke fondly of the former player, saying:"Diego has been one of the best players Australian football has ever seen, and undoubtedly Glory’s greatest overseas recruit of all time.

"His place in the pantheon of Glory greats is well and truly assured and on behalf of our Members and fans, I would like to sincerely thank him for the massive contribution he has made over the past six years.

"We have been fortunate to have had the pleasure of watching a player of his quality and he will always remain a cherished and much-loved member of the Glory family.

"We would like to take this opportunity to wish Diego and his family all the very best for the future."

Personal life
Castro's father, Fernando Castro Santos, also had a career intimately connected with football. He coached several teams in the first and second divisions from 1992 (notably SD Compostela), also working in Portugal. 

Besides his native language, Castro is also able to speak English, describing it as that he had fully learned the language while in Australia as part of the challenge of playing abroad.

Career statistics

Honours
Perth Glory
A-League: Premiers 2018–19

Individual
PFA Team of the Season: 2015–16
PFA A-League Player of the Month: February 2016, March 2016
Johnny Warren Medal: 2015–16

References

External links

1982 births
Living people
Spanish footballers
Footballers from Pontevedra
Association football wingers
La Liga players
Segunda División players
Segunda División B players
Pontevedra CF footballers
Atlético Malagueño players
Málaga CF players
Sporting de Gijón players
Getafe CF footballers
A-League Men players
Perth Glory FC players
Marquee players (A-League Men)
Spanish expatriate footballers
Expatriate soccer players in Australia
Spanish expatriate sportspeople in Australia